KOOO (101.9 FM, "101.9 The Keg") is a radio station broadcasting a variety hits music format. Licensed to La Vista, Nebraska, United States, the station serves the Lincoln and Omaha areas.  The station is currently owned by NRG Media, LLC.  Its studios are located at Dodge Street and 50th Avenue in Midtown Omaha, and its transmitter site is located southwest of Springfield, Nebraska.

History
The station was assigned the callsign KFMQ-FM beginning in 1958, and was located on 95.3 FM. In 1973, KFMQ moved to 101.9 FM. The station was initially licensed to Lincoln.

Rock (1973-1992) 
Beginning in 1973, 101.9 FM was known as "Q102, Nebraska's Rock & Roll Legend", carrying an Album Rock format.

Country (1992-1995) 
The country format lasted until October 3, 1992, when, without warning, the format was dropped and flipped to "Omaha's Young Country, 101.9 KYNN". While the "Hit Kicker" began to gnaw its way up the ratings chart, the station failed to make money, with Midwest Communications selling the station to Mitchell Broadcasting, owner of KKAR, KOIL, and KQKQ.

Alternative (1995-1998) 
On February 17, 1995, at Midnight, KYNN began stunting with an automated countdown. At 6 p.m. on February 21, KYNN became Nebraska's first alternative rock station as "101.9/107.7 The Edge", with a translator on K299AK 107.7 FM to better cover Omaha (at the time, the station's transmitter was located southeast of Eagle, Nebraska; the transmitter would be moved to its current location in late 2001, while K299AK would later simulcast KBLR-FM's then-urban contemporary format until 2007, when that format moved to KCTY and the translator was discontinued due to a new sign-on from Malvern, Iowa), with the new callsign KGDE. (

Classic hits (1998-2002) 
On April 10, 1998, at 3 p.m., "The Edge" signed off and began stunting by playing "It's the End of the World as We Know It (And I Feel Fine)" by R.E.M on a loop until 7 p.m. that evening, then went into a simulcast of Sweet 98, before flipping to classic hits as "101.9 The Fox" on the 13th at 5:30 a.m., with new callsign KZFX adopted on April 24.

Adult contemporary (2002-2007) 
"The Fox" ended on February 1, 2002, as 101.9 began stunting with the song "Winter Wonderland" on a loop until flipping to adult contemporary as "Lite Rock 101.9" on the 4th at 9 a.m., with new callsign KLTQ to go along with the change.

Adult hits (2007-2017) 
The format lasted until 3 p.m. on December 26, 2007, when 101.9 flipped to Adult Hits as "101.9 The Big O", and adopted its current callsign two days later.

Classic rock (2014-2020) 
On August 11, 2014, 101.9's website was replaced by a picture of a genie's lamp, with the words, "WHAT'S YOUR WISH?". At the same time, KOOO removed all imaging on the former "Big O." The new format, according to website registration, was to be country as 101.9 The Hog. These rumors were confirmed, as 101.9 began running liners the following day saying that the following day at 4 PM, "your wish will come true". 1019thehog.com also ran a countdown clock to the same time, saying the similar "Your Wish Comes True [*] days [*] hours [*] minutes [*] seconds August 13, 2014". However, in a similar way as WLTQ in Milwaukee did so in 2004, KOOO instead flipped to 80s-based Classic rock as 101.9 The Keg at the promised time. The last song on "The Big O" was "Goodbye" by Night Ranger, while the first song on "The Keg" was "Kickstart My Heart" by Mötley Crüe. The station has since evolved towards a more broad-based rock hits direction (similar to its previous adult hits format) with the addition of 1980s' pop, and 1990s' and early-2000s' rock tracks.

Adult hits (2020-present) 
On January 13, 2020, KOOO shifted their format back to a straight forward variety hits direction, while retaining the "Keg" moniker.

History of KOOO callsign
The callsign KOOO was previously assigned to a Dallas, Texas station (which was also known as KEWS-FM for a time). Before that, KOOO was a country music station in Omaha, simulcasting on 1420 AM and 104.5 FM.

Former logo

References

External links

OOO
Radio stations established in 1958
NRG Media radio stations
1958 establishments in Nebraska
Adult hits radio stations in the United States